Harry Kitching (q3 1905 – after 1935) was an English footballer who scored 36 goals in 118 appearances in the Football League playing for Grimsby Town, Lincoln City, Tranmere Rovers and New Brighton. He played as a forward.

References

1905 births
Year of death missing
Footballers from Grimsby
English footballers
Association football forwards
Grimsby Town F.C. players
Boston Town F.C. (1920s) players
Worksop Town F.C. players
Lincoln City F.C. players
Tranmere Rovers F.C. players
New Brighton A.F.C. players
English Football League players
Place of death missing